Nellie Verne Walker (December 8, 1874 – July 10, 1973), was an American sculptor best known for her statue of James Harlan formerly in the National Statuary Hall Collection in the United States Capitol, Washington D.C.

Early years
Nellie Verne Walker was born in Red Oak, Iowa, the daughter of Everett Walker, a stone carver and monument maker, and Rebecca Jane Lindsay Walker. By the age of 17 she was allowed to use her father's tools and began making her own sculpture in her father's monument shop in Moulton, Iowa. Her first noteworthy work was a bust of Abraham Lincoln that was displayed at the Columbian Exposition in 1893, as an exhibit in the Iowa Building there, labeled "The work of an Iowa Girl". She was to return to the theme of Lincoln again in her career. Unable to afford to go to art school, Walker worked as a legal secretary for six years before she could obtain enough money to attend the Art Institute of Chicago.

Ultimately, because of her diminutive size and her work, she became known as "the lady who lived on ladders." When Taft died in 1936, leaving much of the Heald Square Monument – a sculpture group of George Washington, Robert Morris and Haym Salomon – undone, she was one of several sculptors who were commissioned to finish the piece (1941). Not long thereafter she began getting her own commissions and so moved into studio space in the famous (in sculpture circles) Midway Studio where she shared space with Taft and other Chicago sculptors. In 1902, reclusive Colorado Springs millionaire W. S. Stratton died and someone there realized that Walker was in town and asked her to make a death mask, which she did. The family was so impressed with Walker that they commissioned her to do a bust, followed by a large carved granite cemetery marker and finally an over-life-sized statue of Stratton.
 All are still located in the Colorado Springs area.

Lorado Taft, in his groundbreaking  The History of American Sculpture mentions Walker as a significant young sculptor and specifically refers to her Chief Keokuk statue. Like many other sculptors of her era Walker created both architectural and cemetery sculpture. She was a member of the National Sculpture Society and was inducted into the Iowa Women's Hall of Fame in 1987. Late in life, following the 1948 destruction of her Chicago studio, Walker moved to Colorado Springs, Colorado where she occasionally modeled pottery for the Van Briggle Pottery company, and she died there in 1973, aged 98.

Monuments

 Winfield Scott Stratton, (1907), Colorado Springs, Colorado
 Statue of James Harlan, (1909), formerly in the National Statuary Hall Collection, Washington D.C.
 Lanning Fountain, (1911), Smith College, Northampton, Massachusetts
 Chief Keokuk,  (1913), Keokuk, Iowa,
 Senator Isaac Stephenson, (1921), Marinette, Wisconsin
 Memorial to Soldiers of the War of 1812, (1929), Springfield, Illinois
 Suffrage Memorial Panel, (1934), Iowa State Capitol, Des Moines, Iowa
 Lincoln Trail State Memorial, (1937), near Lawrenceville, Illinois
 Haym Salomon figure for the Heald Square Monument, (1941), Chicago, Illinois

Architectural sculpture
 figures of Friendship and Character, (1929) Michigan League Building, Ann Arbor, Michigan
 Monumental figures of  Moses and  Socrates for the courthouse in Jackson, Mississippi
 Panels, Iowa State University Library, Ames, Iowa
 Royal Neighbors Building, (1927) Rock Island, Illinois

Cemetery works

 Winfield Scott Stratton, (1905), Colorado Springs, Colorado
 Lillian Watson, (1909), Chicago, Illinois
 Delos Diggins, (1909), Cadillac, Michigan
 Johannes Decker, (1910), Battle Creek, Michigan
 Fred and Carrie Diggins, (1916), Cadillac, Michigan
 W.W. Mitchell, (1916), Cadillac, Michigan
 Helen McMullen, (1919), Minneapolis, Minnesota
 Charles W. Shippey, (1922), Chicago, Illinois
 Myron L. Learned, (1928), Omaha, Nebraska
 Milton T. Barlow, (1930), Omaha, Nebraska
 Carl Gray, (1940), Baltimore, Maryland
 Butterfield Monument, (ca. 1920), Grand Rapids, Michigan

Sources
 Contemporary American Sculpture, The California Palace of the Legion of Honor, Lincoln Park, San Francisco, The National Sculpture Society  1929
 Hunt, Inez, the Lady who Lived on Ladders, Filter Press, Palmer Lake, Colorado, 1970
 Kvaran, Einar Einarsson Cemetery Sculpture in America, unpublished manuscript
 McConnell, Susan, Public Treasures: Outdoor Sculpture in the Pikes Peak Region, City of Colorado Springs, Parks and Recreation Department,  1995
 Opitz, Glenn B, Editor, Mantle Fielding’s Dictionary of American Painters, Sculptors & Engravers,  Apollo Book, Poughkeepsie NY, 1986
 Rubenstein, Charlotte Streifer, American Women Sculptors, G.K. Hall & Co., Boston  1990
 Taft, Lorado, The History of American Sculpture, MacMillan Co., New York,  NY  1925

References

External links

 WIU
 UIUC Library
 Iowa State University Library

American women sculptors
Artists from Chicago
Artists from Colorado Springs, Colorado
School of the Art Institute of Chicago alumni
1874 births
1973 deaths
Sculptors from Iowa
People from Red Oak, Iowa
People from Moulton, Iowa
20th-century American sculptors
20th-century American women artists
National Sculpture Society members
Sculptors from Illinois
Sculptors from Colorado